A Kid is a 2016 French-Canadian drama film written and directed by Philippe Lioret and starring Pierre Deladonchamps, Gabriel Arcand and Catherine De Léan. It is loosely based on the book Si ce livre pouvait me rapprocher de toi by Jean-Paul Dubois.

Cast

Accolades

References

External links 
 

2016 films
2010s French-language films
French drama films
Canadian drama films
Films based on French novels
Films directed by Philippe Lioret
2016 drama films
French-language Canadian films
2010s Canadian films
2010s French films